Pine Hill Cemetery is located in Dover, New Hampshire, and was first used as a burial ground in 1730.

Notable interments
Following are interments of notable people:
 James Monroe Buckley (1836–1920), American Methodist doctor, preacher, and editor
 Daniel Meserve Durell (1769–1841), U.S. congressman, elected to represent New Hampshire as an at-large delegate from 1807 to 1809
 George Frost (1720–1796), Revolutionary War Continental Congressman from 1777 to 1779
 Jonathan Grout (1737–1807), U.S. congressman elected to represent Massachusetts's 8th District, serving from 1789 to 1791
 Joshua James Guppey (1820–1893), Civil War Union brevet brigadier general
 John Parker Hale (1806–1873), U.S. congressman, Civil War U.S. senator, elected as a Democrat to represent New Hampshire as an at-large delegate to the House of Representatives in 1843–1845
 William Hale (1765–1848), U.S. congressman; first represented the 3rd District from 1809 to 1811, then as an at-large delegate from 1813 to 1817
 Joshua Gilman Hall (1828–1898), U.S. congressman representing New Hampshire's 1st District from 1879 to 1883, mayor of Dover in 1866, member of the New Hampshire Senate in 1871, member of the New Hampshire House of Representatives in 1874, and U.S. District Attorney for New Hampshire from 1874 to 1879
 Noah Martin (1801–1863), New Hampshire governor
 Charles Henry Sawyer (1840–1908), 41st governor of New Hampshire from 1887 to 1889
 Fred Wesley Wentworth (1864–1943), architect known for many buildings in downtown Paterson, New Jersey, and for the Lucius Varney House in Dover.
 John Wentworth, Jr. (1745–1787), Revolutionary War Continental Congressman

References 

Cemeteries in New Hampshire
Buildings and structures in Dover, New Hampshire
1730 establishments in the Thirteen Colonies
Cemeteries established in the 18th century